Robert McCoy (died 1849) was a congressman from Pennsylvania.

Robert McCoy may also refer to:

People
Robert Bruce McCoy (1867–1926), American general
Robert Nighthawk (also known as Robert Lee McCoy; 1909–1967), American musician
Bob McCoy (Robert McCoy; 1934–2016), American basketball player and coach
Robert McCoy, accused in McCoy v. Louisiana